Lyell Glacier is a glacier flowing in a northerly direction to Harpon Bay at the southeast head of Cumberland West Bay, South Georgia. It was mapped by the Swedish Antarctic Expedition, 1901–04, under Otto Nordenskjöld, who named it for Sir Charles Lyell, an eminent British geologist.

See also
 List of glaciers in the Antarctic
 Glaciology

References

Glaciers of South Georgia